Zhao Haijuan (original name: 趙 海娟; born 11 May 1971) is a track and road cyclist from China. She represented her nation at the 1996 Summer Olympics in the women's road race.

References

External links
 profile at sports-reference.com

Chinese female cyclists
Cyclists at the 1996 Summer Olympics
Olympic cyclists of China
Living people
Place of birth missing (living people)
Cyclists at the 1994 Asian Games
Cyclists at the 1998 Asian Games
Cyclists at the 2002 Asian Games
1971 births
Asian Games medalists in cycling
Medalists at the 1994 Asian Games
Medalists at the 1998 Asian Games
Medalists at the 2002 Asian Games
Asian Games gold medalists for China
Asian Games silver medalists for China
20th-century Chinese women